Next Gen is a 2018 computer-animated science fiction action film that is based on the online manhua 7723 by Wang Nima (which was originally published in Baozou Manhua, which Wang founded and led), and is directed by Kevin R. Adams and Joe Ksander. The film stars the voices of John Krasinski, Charlyne Yi, Jason Sudeikis, Michael Peña, David Cross and Constance Wu. It tells the story of Mai Su, a lonely rebellious teenage girl living in a world where sentient robot technology is commonplace, and 7723, a top-secret weaponized robot, who, through a chance encounter, meet each other and form an unlikely bond that they must use to stop a vicious threat. The film was released on Netflix on September 7, 2018, and was produced almost exclusively using Blender.

Plot
A teenage girl named Mai lives with her mother Molly in Grainland. Her father left them when she was young, after which her mother started to depend on robots causing Mai to feel left out. One day, the two attend a product launch at IQ Robotics headquarters. Annoyed at her mother, Mai wanders off, stumbling into the secret lab of Dr. Tanner Rice, who has been working on an attack robot called 7723. Mai accidentally activates 7723, before getting apprehended by security and returned to her mother. At launch, Justin Pin, the CEO of IQ Robotics, reveals a new generation of Q-Bots to the public, but he secretly designed them to explode. 7723 leaves Rice's lab to find Mai, but is pursued by the city police. He starts to use his weapon systems, making the police forces respond with deadly force. He falls into the lowest levels of the city, damaging his memory core.

When Mai goes outside to check on her dog, Momo, she finds 7723 in her backyard. She initially tries to dismiss him, but after seeing his weapons system, she allows him to stay in the shed. With 7723, Mai confronts some school bullies, by destroying their Q-Bots. The two then embark on a montage of shenanigans throughout the city, but as 7723 accumulates more memories, he struggles to decide which to keep. When Mai confronts him about it, he reveals if he reaches full capacity, he will undergo a total system reset, losing all his memories in the process. Mai suggests deleting his core systems to make room, but he says he would lose functionality.

7723 becomes apprehensive about using his abilities under Mai's orders, and during one instance refuses to blast Mai's school bully leader, Greenwood, when she orders her hurt. This angers Mai so she proceeds to hit Greenwood herself with her bat, but stopping just before completing a swing after Greenwood begins to cry. 7723 subsequently deletes his weapon system to save his memories and prevent himself from hurting any more people, and promises to Mai to never let her down again, but is unknowingly seen by Molly's Q-Bot, allowing Dr. Rice to find him, and he goes to Mai's house to format 7723's memory and take him away. He explains that he built 7723 to prevent an upcoming crisis. Pin and his bodyguard robot Ares arrive, announcing his plan of killing all of humanity. A fight erupts, but without his weapons, 7723 cannot stop Pin from kidnapping Molly and he flees with Mai and Momo into the sewers. Mai snaps at 7723 for deleting his weapon systems and not saving her mother.

Storming off to IQ Robotics to rescue Molly, Mai is quickly apprehended, but 7723 arrives and the two make up. They find Dr. Rice, who warns them of Ares, but before he can say much more, Pin appears and kills him. Mai has noticed that Pin's mannerisms are mimicking Ares', and the resulting fight is taken to a nearby sports stadium, where the truth is eventually and publicly revealed: Ares had killed Pin and has been using a bionic skeleton in his body. Pin once told Ares to make the world "perfect", which Ares believes will only happen through humanity's extinction. With his plans exposed, Ares arms the Q-Bots and merges with a powerful assault armor to overpower 7723, while Mai rescues Molly and evacuates the stadium, but is captured by Ares' Pin body.

Unable to fend off Ares, 7723 makes the decision to reboot himself, restoring his weapons and beginning the process of wiping his memories. Saving Mai, he shares one last goodbye with her before battling Ares on equal footing. After fatally damaging Ares, his system reboot completes before he can destroy Ares, becoming inert. Ares attempts using his now-weakened Pin body to destroy the vulnerable 7723, but Mai decapitates Ares, stopping him for good. 7723 re-activates but fails to recognize Mai.

As everything finally returns to normal, Mai begins making new memories with 7723, the latter slightly start to regain some of old memories.

Voice cast
 John Krasinski as 7723 (credited as "Project 77")
 Charlyne Yi as Mai Su, Molly's daughter who was bullied by Greenwood and her friends due to being a weirdo.
 Jason Sudeikis as Justin Pin / Ares
 Michael Peña as Momo, Mai's foulmouthed dog, which 7723 uses a translator (complete with a profanity filter) to understand him
 David Cross as Dr. Tanner Rice / Q-Bots 
 Constance Wu as Molly Su, Mai's mom
 Kiana Ledé as Greenwood, A girl who bullies Mai for having no friends.
 Anna Akana as Ani, Mai's friend who is also bullied by Greenwood.
 Kitana Turnbull as RJ 
 Jet Jurgensmeyer as Junior 
 Issac Ryan Brown as Ric
 Betsy Sodaro as Gate
 Fred Tatasciore as Police Robots / Robot Podium / Announcer

Production

Next Gen is a Canadian-American-Chinese co-production.

In May 2018, it was announced that Netflix had purchased worldwide rights to Next Gen, an animated film directed by Kevin R. Adams and Joe Ksander, for $30 million. The deal excluded China. Charlyne Yi, Jason Sudeikis, Michael Peña, David Cross, Kitana Turnbull and Constance Wu would lead the voice cast.

Regarding the project being acquired by Netflix, Ksander stated: 

R. Adams added that: 

Next Gen was "effectively 100% created in Blender."

Release
The film was released worldwide except in China by Netflix on September 7, 2018. The film was released theatrically in China on July 19, 2019 by Alibaba Group and Wanda Group.

Reception
Next Gen has received positive reviews.

In Richard Roeper's review for the Chicago Sun Times, he criticized the film's indecisiveness in what audience it was aiming for and said "It's a chore just to keep up with all the shifts in tone, and by the time Next Gen reaches the finish line, we're more exhausted than exhilarated."

However, Joel Keller of Decider found no major problems to prevent enjoyment of the film, writing, "Our Call: STREAM IT. Great voice performances, some funny moments, and a central relationship that will immediately suck you in make NextGen a fun watch for the entire family."

Accolades

Notes

References

External links

  on Netflix
 

2018 films
2018 computer-animated films
American action adventure films
2010s American animated films
American robot films
American comedy-drama films
American children's animated comic science fiction films
American children's animated drama films
Animated buddy films
Animated films based on manhua
Animated films about robots
Chinese action adventure films
Chinese animated films
Chinese children's films
Chinese animated science fiction films
Chinese-language films
Films set in the future
Animated films about friendship
Films based on Internet-based works
2010s buddy comedy films
2010s children's animated films
Anime-influenced Western animation
2018 science fiction action films
2010s English-language films
Fictional robots